The mĕnē, also mina, is an ancient Mesopotamian unit of weight for gold or silver and one of the earliest written words for money. The mĕnē, like the shekel, was also a unit of currency. Before it was used as currency, a mene was a unit of measurement, equal to 567 grams. Terms in other Mesopotamian languages include the Hebrew māneh, Aramaic mĕnē, Syriac manyā, Ugaritic mn, and Akkadian manū. The measurement was adopted by the Ancient Greeks as the mina.

From earliest Sumerian times, a mĕnē was a unit of weight. At first, talents and shekels had not yet been introduced. By the time of Ur-Nammu, the mĕnē had a value of 1/60 talents as well as 60 shekels. or 571 grams of silver (18.358 troy ounces).

At Ugarit, a mĕnē was equivalent to fifty shekels. The prophet Ezekiel refers to a mĕnē ('maneh' in the King James Version) as sixty shekels, in the Book of Ezekiel. Jesus of Nazareth tells the "parable of the mĕnē" in Luke 19:11-27.

From the Akkadian period, 2 mĕnē was equal to 1 sila of water (cf. clepsydra, water clock).

In the Code of Hammurabi which is arguably the first example of written law, mene is one of the most used terms denoting the weight of gold to be paid for crimes or to resolve civil conflicts.

See also
 Mina (unit)

References

Ancient Near East
Units of mass